The Cheshire County Football Association Challenge Cup, commonly known as the Cheshire Senior Cup, is a football knockout tournament founded in the 1879–80 season and involves teams from Cheshire, Greater Manchester and Merseyside, England. It is the County Cup competition of the Cheshire FA and currently involves teams from the Football League and non-league clubs. However, while non-league clubs often field their first team in the competition, professional clubs often field their reserve teams. The inaugural winners of the cup were Northwich Victoria in 1880 and the record winners of the trophy are Macclesfield Town.

Inaugural season (1879-80) 

There were just six clubs who participated in the first season of the Cheshire Senior Cup.  The draw for the first round was made on 3rd February 1880, with the ties played on 14th February 1880.  The full results were:

1st ROUND: Birkenhead v Macclesfield (scratched), Hurdsfield 1-8 Hartford St.Johns, Northwich Victoria 3-0 Crewe Alexandra

SEMI-FINAL: Northwich Victoria 3-1 Birkenhead.  Bye: Hartford St.Johns

FINAL:  Northwich Victoria 2-0 Hartford St.Johns (at Crewe)

Current participants (2022-23)

2022-23 season fixtures and results

Finals 

A full list of finals appears on the Silkmen Archives website.  Results of Finals since the 1978–79 season are:

References

External links 

  Cheshire FA Page

County Cup competitions
Football in Cheshire